Suphankanlaya was a 16th-century Siamese princess who was a queen consort of King Bayinnaung of Burma. There are very few historical records of her life, but legends about her are widespread in Thailand. Many Thais revere her as a national heroine or even as a popular deity.

Biography and legend 
She was the daughter of Maha Thammaracha, viceroy of Phitsanulok and later King of Ayutthaya and his wife Wisutkasat; elder sister of the princes Naresuan and Ekathotsarot who later both became kings of Ayutthaya, too. On her maternal side she was a granddaughter of King Chakkraphat and Queen Suriyothai. In 1564, her father became a vassal of King Bayinnaung of Pegu in Burma. Her brothers were taken to the Peguan court to serve as pages and guarantee for the loyalty of their father, as was usual at the time.

Thai narrative
According to the common narrative in Thailand, in 1571, Suphankanlaya agreed to marry Bayinnaung to become one of his minor wives. This bond, too, should consolidate her father's allegiance to the Burmese king. Her brothers, instead, could return home. She had two children with Bayinnaung. After the king's death in 1581, she became the wife of his son and successor Nanda. In 1584, her father revolted against Nanda. He revoked the oath of allegiance to the Burmese king and it came to war. After her father's death in 1590, her brother Naresuan carried on the fight. In 1593, Naresuan defeated and killed Nanda's son Mingyi Swa in a legendary duel on elephants' backs. When Nanda learnt of his son's death, according to the common narrative in Thailand, he became enraged and stroke Suphankanlaya, who was eight months pregnant with his child, dead.

Burmese records
The Burmese chronicles mention her only in passing. According to the records, her title was Bya Eindra Dewi and her personal name was Amyoyon. She was presented to the king at the Pegu court on 22 January 1567. They had a daughter named Min A-Htwe. Moreover, the chronicles make no mention of her subsequent marriage to Nanda. Her name does not appear in the chronicles' list of queens, junior queens or concubines of Nanda.

Popular cult 
In official accounts of the Siamese and Burmese history, Suphankanlaya is only mentioned in passing, if at all. However, her story entered the Thai national mythology. Legends of her have often been depicted in popular culture. During and after the 1997 Asian financial crisis, she became part of the "pantheon" of Thai national deities. A businesswoman first claimed that Suphankanlaya had saved her from bankruptcy. She then asked a historian to research the chronicles for accounts of the princess and a successful romantic novelist to popularise Suphankanlaya's story in an easy-to-read way. The historian insisted that historic depictions of the princess are very sparse and the story of her gruesome death rather legend than historically traceable. This did not stop large parts of the Thai public from developing a cult around the supposed heroine, worshipping her images and votive objects. As no authentic portrayal of the historic person has survived, the pictures were modelled on the look of former beauty queens.

Suphankanlaya, like her brother Naresuan, was established as a symbol of national assertiveness and self-sacrifice. In Thai folk beliefs, the spirits of murder victims are attributed exceptional powers. The spread of Suphankanlaya worship has to be seen in the context of the rise of Thai nationalist (particularly anti-Burmese) sentiments at that time of economic crisis. It is similar to the emergence of a cult around her grandmother Queen Suriyothai who is (ahistorically) venerated as a strong warrior heroine who sacrificed herself for the sovereignty of the nation, as well. The popular reverence for Suphankanlaya was seized on by Thai authorities and the military. The Third Army command in her presumed native city of Phitsanulok was the first to erect a monument to her and commissioned a biography in 1998, in which the alleged cruelty of her Burmese husband was emphasised. In 2004, a film was made of her legend.

Notes

References

Literature 
 
 
 
 
 

Sukhothai dynasty
Queens consort of Toungoo dynasty
Thai princesses
Legendary Thai people
Heroes in mythology and legend
Folk saints
16th-century Burmese women
16th-century Thai women
Year of birth missing
Year of death missing